Łopacińskis (Sulistrowskis) Palace (Lithuanian: Lopacinskių (Sulistrovskių) rūmai, Polish: Pałac Łopacińskich (Sulistrowskich)) is a building in Vilnius Old Town, Skapo st (Skapo st. 4). Currently it is owned by the State Language Inspectorate and Vilnius Archdiocese Economy Council.

History 
The former masonry building dates back to 1545. The current palace was constructed between 1782 and 1854 by the Sulistrowskis with Marcin Knackfus as the architect.

From the 19th century, it was owned by the Łopacińskis.

References 

Łopaciński family
Palaces in Vilnius